Crassolabium elegans is a species of nematode in the family Qudsianematidae. It is from the Northern Great Plains.

References

External links 

 

Enoplea
Nematodes described in 1974